AHK Thailand or the German-Thai Chamber of Commerce (GTCC) is a non-profit entity which promotes bilateral economic relations between Germany and Thailand. It is a member of the German Chambers of Commerce Worldwide Network (AHKs), with 140 locations in 92 countries around the world.

History 
In 1959 German businesses in Thailand founded a "German Business Group" and soon led to the creation of bilateral Chamber of Commerce.

The German-Thai Chamber of Commerce (GTCC) was officially founded by 57 German and Thai business representatives on 19 July 1962. The inauguration ceremony took place at the Erawan Hotel, Bangkok. By 1965, the GTCC had grown to 100 member companies, and to around 300 during the following 20 years. Since 2017, total membership has been more than 600, making it one of the largest foreign chambers of commerce in Thailand.

Board of directors and management 
The Board of Directors includes fourteen figures in Bangkok's business community, Thai, German and other nationals. Ensuring that the services offered by the Chamber are efficient, comprehensive and up-to-date, the board sets the broad lines of Chamber policy. The current president of the German-Thai Chamber of Commerce is Mr. Michael Welser, Managing Director of Powertech 2004 Co., Ltd. Since July 2015, the Chamber has been managed by the Executive Director Dr. Roland Wein and Deputy Executive Director, Marius Mehner.

Organization 
The GTCC is structured into seven main departments, which are Administration; Corporate Services; German-Thai Dual Excellence Education (GTDEE); Finance; Membership, Events & Communications; and Trade Fairs.

Services 
Address research, individual business partner matching, market information, as well as market entry advisory in Thailand, Germany and the ASEAN countries are just some of the GTCC's services.  
Further services include translations in Thai, German, and English; debt collection and dispute resolution.
Additionally, each GTCC department offers further specialized services. 
While the Corporate Communication department, for example, organizes events, seminars as well as workshops, and publishes a broad range of publications, the Trade Fair department is in charge of exhibition projects and visits to trade fairs in Germany and Thailand.

Membership  
Member companies are diverse, covering a broad range of industries. GTCC's members are small and medium-sized companies as well as large enterprises.  Manufacturers, service providers, financial institutions, trade organizations, and public bodies and educational institutions are among the GTCC's members. With more than 600 members, the GTCC is one of the largest bilateral Chambers of Commerce in Thailand. A membership with the German-Thai Chamber of Commerce offers a variety of benefits, which allow participating companies to emerge with prestige and a good reputation in the German-Thai business community.

Partners 
The German-Thai Chamber of Commerce is co-operating with the German Chambers of Industry and Commerce (IHK) as well as with the Association of German Chambers of Industry and Commerce (DIHK).
Other partners include the German Federal Ministry of Economics and Technology (BMWi), the German International Cooperation (GIZ), The German Business Portal iXPOS, as well as Germany Trade and Invest (GTAI).

Publications 
The Chamber offers a broad range of publications to all interested companies, members or private persons.  The following publications are the most common ones:

 The quarterly UPDATE e-magazine	
 GTCC Membership Directories (online)	
 Annual Publications
 Market studies and special reports

The GTCC's quarterly magazine, called UPDATE, covers special sections on economic and trade news, new technology, trade fairs and a contact section where German and Thai companies seek trading, licensing and joint-venture partners. Member companies are invited to present profiles of themselves as well as news about their enterprises. 
Each year, the GTCC publishes its Membership Directory, where the chamber's work, its board of directors and management, as well as all members, are introduced. 
On request a full list of studies on industrial products and sectors is available as well. The chamber has also developed model contracts for agreements and guides on trade and investment.

References

External links 
 
 Association of German Chambers of Industry and Commerce 
 German Chambers of Commerce 
 German ASEAN Chamber Network (GACN)

Organizations established in 1962
Business organizations based in Thailand